Visible World is an album by Norwegian saxophonist Jan Garbarek recorded in 1995 and released on the ECM label.

Reception 
The Allmusic review by Chris Kelsey awarded the album 2½ stars stating "This is quiet, contemplative music for the most part -- attractive, but not superficially pretty. Its grooves are less celebratory than melancholic. There's an intensity here borne of deep concentration and commitment to beauty. Garbarek has come a long way since his early days as a quasi-free jazz experimentalist. This music is not jazz, nor is it experimental. But it is compelling in its way, representative of a first-rate creative musician, beyond category".

Track listing 
All compositions by Jan Garbarek except as indicated
 "Red Wind" - 3:52 
 "The Creek" - 4:30 
 "The Survivor" - 4:46 
 "The Healing Smoke" - 7:13 
 "Visible World (Chiaro)" - 4:07 
 "Desolate Mountains I" - 6:46 
 "Desolate Mountains II" - 6:02 
 "Visible World (Scuro)" - 4:32 
 "Giulietta" - 3:45 
 "Desolate Mountains III" - 1:28 
 "Pygmy Lullaby" (Traditional) - 6:12 
 "The Quest" - 2:58 
 "The Arrow" - 4:21 
 "The Scythe" - 1:48 
 "Evening Land" (Jan Garbarek, Mari Boine) - 12:29 
Recorded at Rainbow Studio in Oslo, Norway in June 1995

Personnel 
 Jan Garbarek - soprano saxophone, tenor saxophone, keyboards, percussion
 Rainer Brüninghaus - piano, synthesizer (tracks 3, 4, 6, 7 & 10-12) 
 Eberhard Weber - bass  (tracks 2, 3, 7, 8, 11 & 12) 
 Manu Katché - drums (tracks 2, 3, 11 & 13) 
 Marilyn Mazur - drums  (tracks 6, 7 & 9), percussion (tracks 1, 4, 5, 8, 9, 11-13 & 15) 
 Trilok Gurtu - tabla (track 13)
 Mari Boine -  vocals (track 15)

References 

1996 albums
ECM Records albums
Jan Garbarek albums
Albums produced by Manfred Eicher